NGC 2170 is a reflection nebula in the constellation Monoceros.  It was discovered on October 16, 1784 by William Herschel.

References

External links 
 
 
 
 
 The Interactive NGC Catalog Online: NGC 2170
 SIMBAD: NGC 2170
 NASA/IPAC Extragalactic Database: NGC 2170

Reflection nebulae
Monoceros (constellation)
2170